Kate Stewart (born 16 January 1995), also formerly known as KStewart, is an English singer-songwriter. She featured on the vocal version of Oliver Heldens's "Koala", and her song "Ain't Nobody" charted at number 86 on the UK Singles Chart. On 23 November 2018, she released her first EP, named In the Beginning.

Life and career

1995-2017: Early life and career beginnings
Kate Stewart was born on 16 January 1995 in London and grew up in Maida Vale. She grew up in an artistic family: her father is a comedian and her mother was a dancer. Stewart has a brother who is a music producer and songwriter. She was educated at Arts Educational Schools, London (ArtsEd) in Chiswick, where she learned musical theatre. She initially wanted to be an actress, but later turned to music.

In 2014, under the name "KStewart", she released her first single "Tell Me 'Bout That", which she collaborated in concert with British duo Bondax. During these years, she worked and collaborated with many artists such as Matoma, Sean Paul, Yungen, TCTS, and Craig David. Stewart was invited to perform her music with French DJ David Guetta for Danse avec les stars, the French equivalent of Strictly Come Dancing. Stewart was signed to Warner Music Group, making pop-oriented music.

2018-present: In the Beginning 
In May 2018, Stewart announced her new project and released the first single "Loving You", at the same time going independent and changing her stage name to "Kate Stewart". On 23 November 2018, she released her first EP "In the Beginning" under the label Platoon. On 11 February 2019, Stewart released a music video for "Bad Enough". Later in 2019, she announced a collaboration with singer and songwriter Ryan Ashley for the song "Innocent", which was released on 3 June.

Artistry

Influences
Stewart grew up listening to pop artists such as Whitney Houston, Destiny's Child, Beyoncé, Mariah Carey and Christina Aguilera. Other musicians she admire include D'Angelo and Frank Ocean.

Voice
Stewart is a soprano and possesses a three-octave vocal range. Her voice has received comparisons with Ariana Grande and Jorja Smith.

Discography

EPs

Singles

as lead artist

as featured artist

Guest appearances

Songwriting Credits

References

External links
 
 
 
 KStewart-YouTube
 KStewart-SoundCloud

1995 births
Living people
English women singer-songwriters
Singers from London
English women pop singers
English dance musicians
English soul singers
English sopranos
Singers with a three-octave vocal range
British contemporary R&B singers
Feminist musicians
Dance-pop musicians
21st-century English women singers
21st-century English singers
People educated at the Arts Educational Schools